Remo Amadio (born 24 November 1987) is an Italian footballer who plays as a goalkeeper for  club Recanatese.

References

1987 births
Living people
Sportspeople from the Province of Teramo
Footballers from Abruzzo
Italian footballers
Association football goalkeepers
Serie B players
Serie C players
Lega Pro Seconda Divisione players
Serie D players
Promozione players
Delfino Pescara 1936 players
S.S. Fidelis Andria 1928 players
A.S.D. Cassino Calcio 1924 players
Giulianova Calcio players
U.S.D. Recanatese 1923 players
Liga I players
Liga II players
CFR Cluj players
FC UTA Arad players
CSM Corona Brașov footballers
FC Tatabánya players
Italian expatriate footballers
Expatriate footballers in Romania
Italian expatriate sportspeople in Romania
Expatriate footballers in Hungary
Italian expatriate sportspeople in Hungary